Steve Rolls is a Canadian professional boxer.

Career

Amateur career

Steve Rolls was on the 2009 and 2010 Canadian National Boxing Team. In his amateur career he had an 83-14 record. In September 2009, Rolls went to the 2009 International Boxing Association (AIBA) Men’s Boxing Championship in Milan, Italy. He won his first 2 matches, against Georgia's Levan Guledani and Italy's Luca Podda, before losing in the round of 16 against 2008 Olympic bronze medalist Vijender Singh of India. This gave Rolls the rank of No. 12 in the world.

Professional boxing record

References 

 http://ckdp.ca/2011/04/08/chathams-steven-rolls-making-pro-boxing-debut/
 http://www.cksn.ca/2011/04/chatham-boxer-steve-rolls-wins-professional-debut-in-edmonton/
 http://www.mississauga.com/sports/article/80926--rolls-advances-in-world-boxing
 http://boxrec.com/boxer/568032

Sportspeople from Hamilton, Ontario
Year of birth missing (living people)
Date of birth missing (living people)
Living people
Canadian male boxers
Middleweight boxers
Boxing people from Ontario
Black Canadian boxers